Dmitriy Vasilyevich Rozinkevich (born 1 October 1974 in Svetly) is an  Olympic rower who competed for Russia in the two Olympic Games. He won bronze medal in the coxed eight competition 1996 Summer Olympics.

References 
 
 

1974 births
Living people
People from Svetly
Russian male rowers
Rowers at the 1996 Summer Olympics
Rowers at the 2000 Summer Olympics
Olympic rowers of Russia
Olympic bronze medalists for Russia
Olympic medalists in rowing
World Rowing Championships medalists for Russia
Medalists at the 1996 Summer Olympics
European Rowing Championships medalists
Sportspeople from Kaliningrad Oblast